Kevin King may refer to:

Kevin King (American football) (born 1995), American football player
Kevin King (baseball) (born 1969), retired Major League Baseball player
Kevin King (politician) (1922–1983), Australian politician
Kevin King (rugby league) (born 1985), rugby league player
Kevin King (tennis) (born 1991), American tennis player